Gašper Vidmar (born 14 September 1987) is a retired Slovenian professional basketball player. He is 6 ft 11 in (2.11 m) tall and plays the center position.

Professional career
Vidmar played in youth categories of Geoplin Slovan in Slovenia. He made his professional debut with Jance STZ in the Slovenian minors during the 2003–04 season; in 2005, he returned to Slovan.

In 2007, Vidmar signed a multi-year deal with the Turkish club Fenerbahçe. On 8 September 2009 he was loaned to Union Olimpija of his native Slovenia for the 2009–10 season; on 2 April 2010 he returned to Fenerbahçe.

On 11 July 2012 he was loaned to Beşiktaş for the 2012–13 season.

For the 2013–14 season he returned to Fenerbahçe, but suffered a season-ending injury in early February 2014. In October 2014, he signed with Darüşşafaka for the 2014–15 season.

In July 2015, Vidmar joined the New Orleans Pelicans for the 2015 NBA Summer League. However, he didn't make the roster and signed with Banvit on 15 July 2015,  and extended his contract by another two years on 28 June 2017.

On 3 October 2018 Vidmar signed a deal with Italian club Reyer Venezia.

On 15 January 2022 he announced his retirement from professional basketball.

Slovenian national team
He was a Slovenia national team player and played over 100 times. He has been with national team in EuroBasket 2007, 2010 FIBA World Championship, and in EuroBasket 2017, when Slovenia came in 1st place.

References

External links
Gašper Vidmar at euroleague.net
Gašper Vidmar at eurobasket.com
Gašper Vidmar at fiba.com
Gašper Vidmar at tblstat.net

1987 births
Living people
2010 FIBA World Championship players
ABA League players
Bandırma B.İ.K. players
Beşiktaş men's basketball players
Centers (basketball)
Darüşşafaka Basketbol players
Slovenian expatriate basketball people in Turkey
Fenerbahçe men's basketball players
FIBA EuroBasket-winning players
KD Slovan players
KK Olimpija players
Lega Basket Serie A players
Reyer Venezia players
Slovenian expatriate basketball people in Italy
Slovenian men's basketball players
Basketball players from Ljubljana